Jane Caroline Owen (born ) is a British diplomat. She has served as the British ambassador to Switzerland and Liechtenstein and the British ambassador to Norway.

Career
Owen was born in Bilston and educated at Ellerslie School in Malvern (now merged with Malvern College) and Trinity College, Cambridge. After graduating in 1986 she taught English in Japan as part of the JET Programme. In 1987 she entered the Foreign and Commonwealth Office (FCO). After Japanese language training 1988–90 she worked at the Tokyo embassy 1990–93 and then was seconded to the Department of Trade and Industry as head of the Exports to Japan Unit 1993–96. She returned to the FCO 1996–98 and was then posted to Hanoi as deputy head of mission 1998–2002. She returned to Tokyo as director of trade promotion 2002–06, then was posted to New Delhi as director of UK Trade and Investment (UKTI) in India 2006–10. She was British ambassador to Norway 2010–14, chief operating officer of UKTI in London 2014–16, then was appointed ambassador to the Swiss Confederation and concurrently non-resident ambassador to the Principality of Liechtenstein.

References

1963 births
Living people
Alumni of Trinity College, Cambridge
Ambassadors of the United Kingdom to Norway
Ambassadors of the United Kingdom to Switzerland
Ambassadors of the United Kingdom to Liechtenstein
British women ambassadors